The 2019 Eldora Dirt Derby was a NASCAR Gander Outdoors Truck Series race held on August 1, 2019, at Eldora Speedway in Rossburg, Ohio. Contested over 150 laps on the  dirt track, it was the 15th race of the 2019 NASCAR Gander Outdoors Truck Series season.

Background

Track

Located north of Rossburg, Ohio in the village of New Weston, Ohio. Originally constructed as a 1/4-mile semi-banked clay dirt oval by track founder and legendary promoter Earl Baltes, Eldora was enlarged to a 3/8-mile length and later to the "half-mile" standard required by the United States Auto Club (USAC) for National Championship events featuring the stars of the Indianapolis 500.

Entry list

Practice

First practice

Final practice

Qualifying heat races
Chase Briscoe scored the pole for the race after winning the first qualifying heat race.

Race 1

Race 2

Race 3

Race 4

Race 5

"Last Chance" qualifying race

Starting lineup

Race

Summary
Chase Briscoe started on pole and remained in the lead, winning Stage 1 despite cautions caused by Landon Huffman and Jake Griffin spinning on separate occasions. Harrison Burton later spun on the backstretch on lap 57. A huge crash occurred on lap 65 after Christian Eckes spun around and collected numerous others including Johnny Sauter, Mason Massey, and Jeffrey Abbey. Stage 2 was also won by Briscoe, who had continued his strong lead.

After Stage 2, Stewart Friesen took over the lead. Ross Chastain spun in front of the field, though did not cause any major damage. Kyle Strickler brought out the next caution after spinning out, while another crash collected Briscoe, Sauter, and Tyler Dippel. At the same time, Jennifer Jo Cobb got turned by Norm Benning and collected Devin Dodson.

Dippel failed an attempted slide job on Ben Rhodes late in the race, pushing Rhodes into the fence and dropping him six spots behind Dippel. After the race, Dippel rammed into Rhodes on the cool-down lap, leading Rhodes to attempt to drag Dippel out of his truck on pit road after the race before being pulled away by NASCAR officials. Dippel later called out Rhodes in an expletive-laced tirade, calling it "cool" that Rhodes would miss the playoffs and implying that Rhodes was scared of fighting him. Rhodes, in a calmer post-race interview, called Dippel a dirty driver.

On the final restart, Friesen stayed out and was able to maintain his lead, holding off Sheldon Creed and Grant Enfinger to win the dirt derby. This was also Friesen's first win in the truck series.

Stage Results

Stage One
Laps: 40

Stage Two
Laps: 50

Final Stage Results

Stage Three
Laps: 60

References

Eldora Dirt Derby
Eldora Dirt Derby
NASCAR races at Eldora Speedway